Orientale may refer to:

 Orientale Province, a former province of the Democratic Republic of the Congo
 Mare Orientale, a major surface feature of the Earth's Moon
 Purosangue Orientale, a breed of horse

See also
 Oriental
 Orient (disambiguation)